Jaffna Hindu College (abbreviated as JHC) is a national school in Jaffna, Sri Lanka. It was founded in 1886 by a group of Hindu people who wanted an English language alternative to the Christian missionary schools.

History
In the late 19th century all the English language schools in the area were run by Christian missionaries. In 1886, Williams Nevins Muthukumaru Sithamparapillai founded The Native Town High School. The school encountered financial problems and in 1889 it was taken over by S. Nagalingam, who re-located it to Vananarponnai. The school was renamed Nagalingam Town High School. In 1890, the school was handed over to the Jaffna Saiva (Samaya) Paripalana Sabhai. The school was moved to its present site and renamed The Hindu High School.

Big Match
JHC play Kokkuvil Hindu College in an annual cricket match known as the Battle of the Hindus. The first match took place in 2008.

Principals

 1890-92 S. Godman Appapillai
 1892-09 Nevins Selvadurai
 1910-13 A. Shiva Rao
 1913-14 B. Sanjiva Rao
 1914-26 Nevins Selvadurai
 1926-27 W. A. Troupe
 1927-28 M. Sabarathnasinghe
 1928-33 V. R. Venkataramanan
 1933-52 A. Cumaraswamy
 1953-61 V. M. Asaipillai
 1962-64 C. Sabaratnam
 1964-71 N. Sabaratnam
 1971 M. Karthigesan
 1971-75 E. Sabalingam
 1975-84 P. S. Kumaraswamy
 1984-90 S. Ponnampalam
 1990-91 K. S. Kugathasan
 1991-96 A. Panchalingam
 1996-05 A. Srikumaran
 2005-14 V. Ganesarajah
 2014–17 I. Thayanandarajah
 2018-19 S. Nimalan (Acting)
 2019 - Ratnam Senthilmaran

Notable alumni

 K. Aiyadurai – Chairman of Jaffna Urban Council
 Eliathamby Ambikairajah – Head of the School of Electrical Engineering & Telecommunications, University of New South Wales
 P. Ayngaranesan – Provincial Minister of Agriculture
 A. M. A. Azeez – Member of the Senate, Assistant Government Agent, Principal of Zahira College, Colombo
 C. Balasingham – Permanent Secretary, Ministry of Health
 N. Balasubramaniam – ambassador
 P. Balasundarampillai – Vice-Chancellor of the University of Jaffna
 C. Coomaraswamy – Member of the Senate, High Commissioner, Government Agent
 A. Cumarswamy – Principal of Jaffna Hindu College
 Yogendra Duraiswamy – diplomat
 B. Gajatheepan – Member of the Northern Provincial Council for Jaffna District
 T. T. Jayaratnam – Principal of Mahajana College, Tellippalai
 Sri Ranga Jeyaratnam – Member of Parliament for Nuwara Eliya District and TV broadcaster
 K. Kailasapathy – President of the Jaffna Campus of the University of Sri Lanka
 V. Kailasapillai – Deputy Chairman of John Keells Holdings
 P. Kanagasabapathy – Dean of the Science Faculty, Jaffna Campus of the University of Sri Lanka
 R. Kanagasuntheram – Dean of the Faculty of Medicine, University of Jaffna
 P. Kandiah – Member of Parliament for Point Pedro
 V. A. Kandiah – Member of Parliament for Kayts
 Nalliah Kumaraguruparan – Member of the Western Provincial Council for Colombo District
 S. Mahadevan – co-founder of Capital Maharaja
 S. Nadesan – Member of the Senate, leading lawyer
 S. Nagarajah – Mayor of Jaffna
 K. S. Naguleswaran – Associate Professor of Mechanical Engineering
 K. Navaratnam – Member of Parliament for Jaffna District
 K. V. Navaratnam –  District Judge
 K. Palakidnar – President of the Court of Appeal
 V. M. Panchalingam – Government Agent for Jaffna District
 K. Parameswaran – Secretary of Ministry of Hindu Affairs
 Shiva Pasupati – Attorney General of Sri Lanka
 Pottu Amman (Shanmugalingam Sivashankar ) – senior member of the Liberation Tigers of Tamil Eelam
 S. Rajandram – co-founder of Capital Maharaja
 Vettivelu Sabanayagam – Deputy Director General of Education
 E. Saravanapavan – Member of Parliament for Jaffna District
 S. Selvanayagam – Head of the Department of Geography, University of Jaffna
 Suppiah Sharvananda – Chief Justice of Sri Lanka, Governor of the Western Province
 R. Sivagurunathan – Editor-in-Chief of Thinakaran
 Pon Sivakumaran – Militant
 Siva Sivananthan – Director of the Microphysics Laboratory, University of Illinois at Chicago
 T. Sivapragasapillai – Professor of Engineering
 V. Sivasubramaniam – Judge, Supreme Court of Ceylon
 T. Somasekaram – Surveyor General of Sri Lanka
 M. Srikantha – Permanent Secretary, Ministry of Agriculture & Lands and Ministry of Irrigation & Power
 K. Sripavan – Chief Justice of Sri Lanka
 S. Sritharan – Member of Parliament for Jaffna District
 K. C. Thangarajah – co-founder of Eelanadu, Chairman of Paper Mills Corporation
 K. Thavalingam – Surveyor General of Sri Lanka
 S. Thilainadaraja – Additional Secretary
 Thileepan (Rasaiah Parthipan) – member of the Liberation Tigers of Tamil Eelam who died while on hunger strike
 T. S. Thurairajah – Mayor of Jaffna
 N. A. Vaithialingam – Chief Engineer of Ceylon Government Railway
 C. Vanniasingam – Member of Parliament for Kopay, co-founder of the Illankai Tamil Arasu Kachchi (Federal Party)
 Raja Viswanathan – Mayor of Jaffna
 N. Vithyatharan – editor of Uthayan

See also
 List of schools in Northern Province, Sri Lanka

Notes

References

External links
 
 
 
 
 
 
 

 
1886 establishments in Ceylon
Boys' schools in Sri Lanka
Educational institutions established in 1886
Former Hindu schools in Sri Lanka
National schools in Sri Lanka
Schools in Jaffna